Ferenc József, 1st Prince Koháry de Csábrág et Szitnya (4 September 1767, in Vienna – 27 June 1826, in Oroszvár), was a Hungarian magnate and statesman. He was a member of the noble House of Koháry and served as Hungarian Chancellor. On 15 November 1815, Emperor Francis I of Austria awarded him the title of Fürst von Koháry de Csábrág et Szitnya.

Early life
He was the son of Ignác József Anton Franz Xaver, Count Koháry de Csábrág et Szitnya (Szent-Antal, 2 December 1726 – Vienna, 10 October 1777) and his wife, Countess Maria Gabriella Cavriani zu Unter-Waltersdorf (Vienna, 25 April 1736 – Pest, 29 July 1803), who were married at Seiffersdorf on 15 January 1758.

Marriage and issue
On 13 February 1792, he married Countess Maria Antonia von Waldstein-Wartenberg in Vienna. They had two children, a son Ferenc (21 December 1792 – 19 April 1795) and a daughter Maria Antonia (Vienna, 2 July 1797 – Vienna, 25 September 1862).

The latter ultimately became the heiress of his whole fortune of 20 million francs. On 30 November 1815 in Vienna, she married Prince Ferdinand of Saxe-Coburg and Gotha (Coburg, 28 March 1785 – Vienna, 27 August 1851), by whom she had issue, the so-called Princes of Saxe-Coburg and Gotha-Koháry.

Ancestry

Sources

 
 Genealogy of Maria Antonia Koháry
 Franz Karl Wißgrill: Schauplatz des landsässigen Nieder-Österreichischen Adels vom Herren- und Ritterstande, Band 5, Seite 177ff.
 Constantin von Wurzbach: Biographisches Lexikon des Kaiserthums Oesterreich, Band 12, Seite 284

Notes

External links 
 

Ferencz
1767 births
1826 deaths
Knights of the Golden Fleece of Austria